Luis Minami (born 13 February 1943) is a Peruvian boxer. He competed in the men's lightweight event at the 1968 Summer Olympics.

References

1943 births
Living people
Peruvian male boxers
Olympic boxers of Peru
Boxers at the 1968 Summer Olympics
Boxers at the 1967 Pan American Games
Pan American Games silver medalists for Peru
Pan American Games medalists in boxing
People from Ica Region
Lightweight boxers
Medalists at the 1967 Pan American Games
20th-century Peruvian people
21st-century Peruvian people